Palmarito Airport  is an airport serving Palmarito (Apure), a town in Apure state, Venezuela.

See also
Transport in Venezuela
List of airports in Venezuela

References

External links
OpenStreetMap - Palmarito
OurAirports - Palmarito
SkyVector - Palmarito

Airports in Venezuela